Carola is an unincorporated community in southeastern Butler County, in the U.S. state of Missouri.

The Black River flows past the west side of the community.

History
A post office called Carola was established in 1882, and remained in operation until 1913. The community was named after a boat belonging to a group of German first settlers.

References

Unincorporated communities in Butler County, Missouri
Unincorporated communities in Missouri